Masters of Hawaiian Slack Key Guitar is an album released in 2010. It won a Grammy Award for Best Hawaiian Music Album. It reached number fifteen on the Billboard Top World Music Albums chart.

It featured Owana Salazar.

References

Grammy Award for Best Hawaiian Music Album
Hawaiian music
2010 albums